The Bomfunk MC's is a Finnish hip hop group that was active between 1998 and 2005, before reuniting in 2018. The group's frontman is the rapper B.O. Dubb (born Raymond Ebanks, and formerly known as "B.O.W."), and the main producer is Jaakko Salovaara, known as "JS16".

Career

1999–2005
The band's debut release was the 1999 album In Stereo (Sony Music), which contained the singles "Freestyler", "Uprocking Beats", and "B-Boys & Flygirls", all of which were popular in the United Kingdom. "Uprocking Beats" reached the number one position on the Finnish Dance charts. In Stereo sold over 600,000 units.

The album's success led to the release of "Freestyler" in Scandinavia and Germany; by 2000, "Freestyler" was popular throughout Europe, becoming the region's highest-selling single of the year. The single also reached the number one position in Australia, New Zealand, Denmark, Norway, Sweden, the Netherlands, Italy, and Germany, and was number 2 in the United Kingdom. However, the single led to a minor controversy: the line, "Who the fuck is Alice, is she from Buckingham Palace?", was censored for the UK radio version, and the video featured intensive Sony product placement.

The Bomfunk MC's won the 2000 Best Nordic Act award at the MTV Europe Music Awards.

In 2002, the group released their second album Burnin' Sneakers, spawning the singles "Super Electric", "Live Your Life", featuring Max'C, and "(Crack it!) Something Goin' On" with Jessica Folcker. This album gained less attention internationally, though it sold well in Finland. "Something Goin' On" reached the German top 10.

In September 2002, DJ Gismo decided to leave the band (shortly afterwards joining the band Stonedeep), and was promptly replaced by Riku Pentti (DJ), Troni Mcburger (synths and programming) and Okke Komulainen (keyboards). After they joined, Bomfunk MC's released a special remix of "Back to Back".

In 2004, their third and last album Reverse Psychology was released by Universal Music, preceded by the single "No Way in Hell". In the autumn of that year, they released another single from that album, "Hypnotic", featuring Elena Mady. Half of the album was produced by JS16, and the other half by Pentti, Komulainen, and Mäkinen, who called themselves The Skillsters Plus One.

Reverse Psychology and its singles did not garner much attention outside the Nordic countries. Both of the singles reached the German top 100 but did not chart elsewhere in Western Europe. Fan reception was mixed. A lot of fans still saw DJ Gismo as one half of the face of the band, despite DJ Gismo not being involved in the production of the band's music, except for providing scratches; the remixes of Bomfunk tracks carrying his name were produced by the band's producer, JS16.

In 2005, Bomfunk MC's toured New Zealand during university orientation playing dates in Dunedin, Christchurch, Wellington, Hamilton and Auckland in support of their album Reverse Psychology.

2019–present
Many of the band's collaborators dedicated themselves to other musical projects or activities or faded into obscurity. The band's main producer and mentor, JS16, remained musically active as a solo artist; 2007 saw the release of his first solo track in over half a decade, "Rosegarden" (which achieved significant club play). He is also a successful remixer and forms half of the successful dance act Dallas Superstars.

In the summer of 2019 the band made their comeback with the classic line-up. They played at several festivals, introducing two new tracks, "Can't Runaway" and "Mic Drop". B.O. Dubb and DJ Gismo took part along with their producer JS16 who became an official member of the group.

In February 2019, the video for "Freestyler" was reshot as a tribute for the 20th anniversary of its release. The new version features the original band members and re-enacts scenes from the original but with a modern twist. This includes replacing the Sony mini-disk player that controlled the music with a smart phone, changing the main character from male to female, and introducing some modern dance styles. The video was shot in Belgrade, Serbia.

In popular culture
Two of Bomfunk MC's songs have been featured in the PlayStation racing game Firebugs. They were "We R Atomic", and "Put Ya Hands Up". Both songs are from the album Burnin' Sneakers.

Members
Current members
Raymond Ebanks (a.k.a. B.O.W. or B.O. Dubb) – MC (1998–2005, 2019–present)
Ismo Lappalainen (a.k.a. DJ Gismo) – DJ (1998–2002, 2019–present)
Jaakko Salovaara (a.k.a. JS16) – producer (2019–present)

Former members
Ville Mäkinen (a.k.a. Mr Wily) – bass, keyboards, backing vocals (1998–2005)
Riku Pentti (a.k.a. DJ Infekto) – DJ (2002–2005)
Okke Komulainen – keyboards (2002–2005)
Ari Toikka (a.k.a. A.T.) – drums (1998–2005)

Discography

Albums

Singles

Music videos
 "Uprocking Beats" (1999)
 "B-Boys & Flygirls" (1999)
 "Freestyler" (1999)
 "B-Boys & Flygirls Y2K Mix" (2000)
 "Uprocking Beats JS 16 Radio Mix" (2000)
 "Super Electric" (2001)
 "Live Your Life" (2002)
 "(Crack It!) Something Goin' On" (2002)
 "Back to Back" (2002)
 "No Way in Hell" (2004)
 "Hypnotic" (2005)
 "Freestyler" (2019)

See also
 List of best-selling music artists in Finland
 Finnish hip hop

References

External links

Musical groups established in 1997
1997 establishments in Finland
2005 disestablishments in Finland
Musical groups disestablished in 2005
Musical groups reestablished in 2018
Sony Music Publishing artists
Finnish hip hop groups
Electronica music groups
MTV Europe Music Award winners